Villasequilla is a municipality located in the province of Toledo, Castilla–La Mancha, Spain. According to the 2006 census (INE), the municipality has a population of 2,515 inhabitants.

References

Municipalities in the Province of Toledo